Passu is a small village located in Gojal valley upper Hunza of the Gilgit Baltistan, Pakistan region of Northern Pakistan. Situated along the Karakoram Highway in Upper Hunza, Pakistan, Passu is a popular tourist destination in Pakistan and all over the world because of its easily accessible sweeping landscapes, and vistas of the 7,478 m (24,534 ft) tall Passu Sar mountain, the Passu Glacier, and  6,106m (20,033 ft).

Geography 
Passu is located in Gojal Valley, in the sub division of District Hunza.

It lies very near the tongue of the Passu Glacier, and just south of the tongue of the Batura Glacier. Borith Lake is a large water feature below the Hussaini village in the area.

Tupopdan  also known as 'Passu Cones' or 'Passu Cathedral', lies to the north of the Gulmit village in Gojal Valley. It is the most photographed peak of the region. Also nearby are the high peaks of Pasu Sar, Shispare Sar, and Batura.

Demographics 
The people are predominantly Wakhi and speak the Wakhi language. They are Ismaili, a sect of Shia Islam.

See also
Khuramabad

References

Populated places in Hunza District